The Alfa Romeo Boxer engine was a water-cooled flat-4 piston engine developed by Alfa Romeo for front-wheel drive, longitudinal applications.
It debuted on the Alfasud, which was introduced in 1971 at the Turin Motor Show. In the following decades the Boxer went through several upgrades and powered many Alfa Romeo front-wheel drive cars up to 1996 (not the 164). In 1997 it was phased out and replaced by the transversely-mounted Twin Spark engines.

Description
This liquid-cooled, four cylinder, boxer (horizontally opposed) engine had a belt-driven water pump. Its integrated cast iron cylinder block and crankcase had three main bearings. The two aluminum alloy crossflow cylinder heads had one or two overhead camshaft in each, driven by individual timing belts, and two valves per cylinder (four valves per cylinder in the 1700 16V version). Wet sump lubrication.

The fuel delivery system depended on version: a single-barrel downdraft carburetor; one or two double-barrel downdraft carburetors; Bosch LE 3.1 Jetronic fuel injection (8 valve engines).; or Bosch Motronic ML 4.1 fuel injection (16 valve engines).

1200

Applications:
 1971–1983 Alfa Romeo Alfasud
 1984–1986 Alfa Romeo Arna
 1984–1986 Nissan Cherry Europe (rebadged Alfa Romeo Arna, sold also as Nissan Pulsar Milano on the Japanese market) 
 1983–1986 Alfa Romeo 33 (late versions for export only)

1300
This engine produced . A version of this engine (engine type 901.U0) was fitted with a catalytic converter, air injection, and evaporative emissions controls and received Californian emissions certification in 1976. The Alfasud was nonetheless never exported to the United States.

Applications:
 1977–1983 Alfa Romeo Alfasud
 1977–1983 Alfa Romeo Sprint

1400
The  was usually labelled a "1.3" in spite of its displacement. It produced  with one or two double-barrel carburettors. It retained the  bore but used the 1500s  crankshaft.

Applications:
 1978–1983 Alfa Romeo Alfasud
 1978–1989 Alfa Romeo Sprint
 1983–1995 Alfa Romeo 33
 1994–1997 Alfa Romeo 145
 1995–1997 Alfa Romeo 146

1500

From 1978 until October 1986, the largest member of the family was the  "1500" with  bore and stroke. It was built until 1995 and produced . This is the largest engine to have been installed in Alfasuds.

Applications:
 1978–1983 Alfa Romeo Alfasud
 1978–1989 Alfa Romeo Sprint
 1984–1986 Alfa Romeo Arna
 1983–1995 Alfa Romeo 33
 1985–1986 Clan Clover
 1984–1986 Nissan Cherry Europe

1600
The  produced .

Applications:
 1994–1997 Alfa Romeo 145
 1995–1997 Alfa Romeo 146

1700

Applications:
 October 1986 – 1995 Alfa Romeo 33
 October 1986 – 1989 Alfa Romeo Sprint

1700 16V
Only available in fuel-injected form, the 1.7 16V was equipped with the Bosch Motronic ML 4.1 system.

The last Alfa Romeo flat-four engine was produced in 1997, after a run of 26 years.

Applications:
 January 1990 – 1995 Alfa Romeo 33 (2nd generation)
 1994–1997 Alfa Romeo 145
 1995–1997 Alfa Romeo 146

References

Boxer
Boxer engines
Gasoline engines by model